CCPP may refer to:
 Center for Cosmology and Particle Physics
 Combined cycle power plant
 Come Croquetas Pinche Perro
 Contagious caprine pleuropneumonia